Jaime Jimenez Bautista (born February 10, 1957) is a Filipino businessman who is currently the Secretary of the Department of Transportation of the Philippines since June 30, 2022. He previously served as president and chief operating officer of Philippine Airlines from 2004 to 2012, and again from 2014 up to 2019.

Background
Bautista is an Independent Director of Premium Leisure Corp. and Nickel Asia Corp. He is the former President and Chief Operating Officer of Philippine Airlines, Inc., as well as a former Executive and Director in MacroAsia Corporation, Macroasia Airport Services Corporation, Macroasia Properties Development Corporation and ETON Properties Philippines, Inc. He was also a former Treasurer of Tan Yan Kee Foundation, Inc. He served in various executive capacities in the Lucio Tan group for 39 years, the last 24 years for Philippine Airlines and its subsidiaries.

Education
Bautista graduated magna cum laude from the Colegio de San Juan de Letran in 1977, with a degree of Bachelor of Science in Commerce, major in Accounting. He is a Certified Public Accountant. He received his Doctorate in Humanities (Honoris Causa) from the Central Luzon State University in 2018.

References

|-

Living people
Filipino accountants
Bongbong Marcos administration cabinet members
Secretaries of Transportation of the Philippines
Colegio de San Juan de Letran alumni
1957 births